Film/video-based therapy involves making movies with clients. It draws from several disciplines from cinema therapy, expressive therapy, narrative therapy, art therapy, digital storytelling, and phototherapy which requires a collaboration to integrate the many dynamic aspects of art and medicine. Joshua Lee Cohen Ph.D., author and co-editor of Video and Filmmaking as Psychotherapy: Research and Practice (published by Routledge in 2015), helped to establish a collaborative effort in forming film/video-based therapy.  This form of therapy is about making films with clients, as opposed to cinema therapy, which involves watching films. Cohen has utilized watching films and mindfulness in his work. Cohen has been cited in Tuval-Mashiach and Patton's clinical trial  and participated in peer reviewed research on the use of video narrative in cancer research. It is not trademarked for advertising or financial purposes but intended to protect the sanctity of the license for mental health professionals and the use of the word "therapy" when used in conjunction with film/video in the United States. (Other countries may have different policies)

Film/video-based therapy is used in both research and practice. It has several names. Each name has a slightly different purpose for each population. In some cases, film/video-based therapy and Virtual Reality can be used with psychological assessments first before using filmmaking as recreational activities. This can keep the clinical aspects from the fun of the recreational activities. Psychological assessments need to be conducted by licensed psychologists, recreational activities can be done with art therapists, Marriage and Family Therapists, Social Workers, filmmakers, digital storytellers, and others qualified to run groups and recreational activities with the support of a licensed clinician. Alcoholics Anonymous and SMART Recovery are just two examples of the use of storytelling and trauma work without requiring a licensed professional as they are often run by peers.  

In California, peers with mental health challenges might run storytelling groups approved by state bill 803 as long as they pass a state-backed peer certification program. Once they pass the certification program, they will bill off of insurance for running these groups.

Therapeutic filmmaking 
This term was coined by J. Lauren Johnson, Ph.D., the co-editor of the academic monograph/book titled Video and Filmmaking as Psychotherapy: Research and Practice. To learn more about Therapeutic Filmmaking, one can read about Johnson and Alderson's pilot study on the subject or Johnson's use of Therapeutic Filmmaking with first nations populations. The term is also used for both veterans and active duty servicemen and women with Benjamin Patton's  and Rivka Tuval-Mashiach's work  work. The work is left intentionally ambiguous, so that the population may not be intimidated by the stigma of a diagnosis. The lack of pressure to call it "therapy" opens up a space to allow for new and old healthy memories to form.

Video remix therapy

Video art therapy is used primarily in private practice with art therapists, drama therapists, and other expressive art therapists. "Stories play a significant role in how we feel about and interact with the world. Narrative therapy and expressive arts therapy are major influences on the creation of expressive remix therapy, a new form of engagement with clients. This article is an exposition of this particular mental health modality. The use of digital media art in therapy in group settings will be discussed, and examples of how to use digital media art and technology in group therapy sessions are provided. The intention of this article is to promote a renewed appreciation for stories as the backdrop for all narrative work; it also seeks to inspire people to look at the practice of mental health differently, particularly the tools used to positively impact clients." Jamerson, J. (2013). Expressive Remix Therapy: Using Digital Media Art in Therapeutic Group Sessions With Children and Adolescents. Creat Nurs Creative Nursing, 182-188.

Digital storytelling 
Digital storytelling is also used in collaboration with film/video-based therapy and is used primarily for education.

Storytelling is an indigenous and ancient way for people to relate to one another and to understand the mysteries of life. Using modern technology, artists have used film and video for expressing ancient and modern images and sounds.

History of film/video-based therapy and other similar therapies 
This method of using film as a healing tool is not a new concept. However, with the advent of modern technology and filmmaking, digital storytelling, virtual reality, and therapeutic filmmaking as well as film/video-based therapy are growing in popularity and the research is growing. It is a collaboration between clinicians and practitioners in art therapy, expressive therapy, phototherapy, psychotherapy, digital storytelling and other mental health and academic fields of study and practice. Currently art therapists, expressive therapists, psychologists, masters level practitioners, psychiatrists, anthropologists, filmmakers, academics, and other clinicians have contributed to this collaborative effort in building a global community to help further define this field.  The use of film and video in, or as, therapy, has a decades-long history in practice. Early work in this field included the post-World War II use of experimental, non-narrative films to calm veterans suffering from shell shock. The 1970s saw boys in a group creating short films together to foster group cohesion, mastery skills, and better communication. With the advent of portable video equipment in the 1970s, female artists began turning the camera on themselves, making themselves the object of their own gaze.

There is a dearth of literature on the theory and practice of using film/video production as therapy and the multidisciplinary practitioners who support its use. Copious literature exists discussing the use of related media in a therapeutic context, such as photography, writing, drawing, music, and drama, but this body of literature is virtually vacant of film/video as a therapeutic medium.

Despite the fact that there is little writing in this area, numerous practitioners from around North America and Europe are quietly working with film/video-based therapy – often independently, as the community of practitioners is still quite small and geographically scattered.

This is an attempt to bridge that gap and bring people together as a global community and new research and practices are emerging.

Virtual reality

Film/video-based therapy can also be used with virtual reality and specifically designed to treat bipolar disorder, phobias, psychosis, etc. Film/Video-based therapy combines somatic techniques, depth psychology, Virtual Reality, and digital storytelling, which is different from the cognitive/exposure therapy being used today in most forms of VR therapy which favors exposure therapy and cognitive behavioral therapy over depth approaches and narrative and makes use of gaming technology like Unreal Engine. Although some exceptions exist as depth approaches are gaining more acceptance after proving evidence based approaches to depth work as in Allan Schore's work at UCLA. Dr. Skip Rizzo at the University of Southern California did the foreword to the second book on Film/Video-Based Therapy. Rizzo (2023) said about Film/Video-Based Therapy in relation to Virtual Reality that "Thus, the potency for using both traditional and new media as a positive driver and influence on mental health demands a deep analysis to support more thoughtful and comprehensive investigations as to the risks and benefits that could be accrued from a fully-connected, experiential, and globally accessible “metaverse.”

Using technology to improve health through narrative

One theory as to why film/video-based therapy works with trauma, may be due to the reprocessing that happens during the final moments of editing, similar to EMDR. In the moment of making a film, one can use somatic experiencing which was designed to regulate the autonomic nervous system. Telling one's story can help to reprocess old memories while avoiding triggers or reprocessing them in a new way using the technology.  There is some research in this area yet, but it is still in development.

Culture

Film/video-based therapy is also about building a therapeutic relationship with a person and a wider support group or community. When dealing with any technology, whether virtual reality or digital storytelling,  the theory remains the same, film/video-based therapy is about using technology for human purposes and building relationships to others and nature. Technology is just the language for understanding, appreciating, and honoring our nature.

References

Sources
 
 Cohen, J. l (Ed.). (2023). Film/Video-Based Therapy and Trauma: Research and Practice (1st ed., Vol. 1, Ser. Advances in Mental Health). Routledge. ISBN 9781032405766

Treatment of mental disorders
Film